SS Cambridge was a Design 1023 cargo ship built for the United States Shipping Board immediately after World War I.

History
She was laid down at yard number 57 at the Newark, New Jersey shipyard of the Submarine Boat Corporation (SBC), one of 132 Design 1023 cargo ships built for the United States Shipping Board (there were 154 ships of the class built in total). She was launched on 30 June 1919, completed in August 1919, and named the Cambridge. Total cost was $1,044,313. In 1925, she was broken up by the Ford Motor Company who purchased 200 vessels from the Shipping Board for $1,706,000 and used the steel to make cars.

References

Bibliography

External links
 EFC Design 1023: Illustrations

1919 ships
Merchant ships of the United States
Ships built by the Submarine Boat Company
Design 1023 ships